Jules of Light and Dark is a 2018 American drama film directed by Daniel Laabs. It was screened at NewFest's 2018 film festival where it won the Grand Jury Prize for Best U.S. Narrative Feature.

Plot
Two young lovers, Maya and Jules, are found wrecked on the side of the road after a party by a loner roughneck, Freddy. During rehab, their relationship falls apart, and Maya forms an unlikely friendship with Freddy.

Cast

Reception
Jules of Light and Dark has been well-received at various film festivals, including NewFest, Outfest, and Austin Film Festival. Stephen Saito wrote “Jules of Light and Dark is the rare film where you not only witness a meaningful change for the characters, but suspect they’ll continue to evolve long after the cameras stop rolling, if for no other reason than you feel as if you’ve experienced a change yourself from seeing it."

References

External links
 

American drama films
2010s English-language films
2010s American films